Sayyad Aran or Sayyad Salahly (15 January 1952 in Garadonlu, Imishli District, Azerbaijan SSR, USSR) is an Azerbaijani social figure, candidate of Philological sciences (2005), one of the founders of New Azerbaijan Party, writer-publicist, and envoy of the Republic of Azerbaijan. In 1995-2005 deputy for the I and II convocation of Milli Majlis of the Republic of Azerbaijan. First deputy chairman of the State Committee on Religious Associations of the Republic of Azerbaijan (since 16 November 2012). Honored Journalist of the Republic of Azerbaijan.

Biography 
Sayyad Adil oglu Salahli was born in a teacher family in Garadonlu village of Imishli on 15 January 1952. The family consisted of 10 children where he was the first.

From 1958 to 1968, he studied at a secondary school in Imishli. From 1968 to 1972, he studied at the Philology faculty of the Azerbaijan State Pedagogical University named after Vladimir Lenin. In 2001, he received a second degree in higher education from Baku State University Law School. In 2005, he defended his dissertation on the topic of "Psychology in the Azerbaijani prose in 1960–1980 years (on the work of Movlud Suleymanli)" in Azerbaijani literature (specialty code: 10.01.01) at the Institute of Literature named after Nizami of Azerbaijan National Academy of Sciences and was honored as a candidate of Philological sciences. After graduating from high school, he was sent to the Azizbekov secondary village school of Imishli by appointment and began to work as a teacher of Language and Literature. From 1973 to 1974, he served as a captain at the military unit number 69626 of the Soviet Army located in Nyjchivand, Qivag.

From 1974 until the end of December 1989, he initially worked as a teacher of Language and Literature in a secondary school in Imishli, then he continued his career as a deputy head of the primary unit, secretary of the first party organization and deputy director for extracurricular upbringing works.

In 1990, he was appointed chief of the Department of Public Education in Imishli, but he was dismissed from the post after no more than one year.

On 2 January 1991 he relocated from Imishli to Baku where he initially worked in "Elm" newspaper where he became head of department. From 1992 to 1995, he became the first deputy editor of the "Səs" (Voice) newspaper.

Since 2001, he worked as the Dean of the Journalism Faculty of Azerbaijan University.

From 2011 to 2012, he worked as a leading adviser of the State Register of Territorial Units and Municipalities of the Service of the Head of Staff in the National Assembly of Azerbaijan (Milli Mejlis).

Social-political activity 

He is one of the founders of the New Azerbaijan Party and one of the initiators and founders of its constituent conference. He was the representative of the first, second, and third congress of NAP. Since 1992, he has been one of the first 50 members of NAP's political council elected at its constituent conference. From 1995 to 1999, he was the chief of NAP's ideology department and its Inter-Party Relations department. In 2006, he was sent to Istanbul for diplomatic service, and according to the Law on Diplomatic Service of the Republic of Azerbaijan, he left the NAP membership and political council. In 2012, he was re-accepted into NAP leadership.

The role of Heydar Aliyev in his career 

Sayyad Aran was one of the closest associates to Heydar Aliyev.

Hundreds of articles described the life of Heydar Aliyev by him was published at periodical press and numerous books about him were published. Sayyad Aran was represented within the delegation jointly with Heydar Aliyev in two historical visits; one to China (7–11 March 1994) and one to the United States of America (26 July – 7 August 1997).

At the parliament 
In 1995, Sayyad Aran was elected a deputy from the Zardab-Imishly-Ujar electional constituency No.67 and in 2000 from the Zardab-Imishli electional constituency No.67 to Milli Majlis of the Republic of Azerbaijan on the basis of the majority electoral system. He was taken an active part in the preparation of a number of legislative acts. For example, at the meeting of the Milli Mejlis of the Republic of Azerbaijan held on 20 October 2009, deputy Elmira Akhundova spoke about Sayyad Aran during the discussion of the next law project on mass media: I consider that the most progressive and substantial law in this field was adopted by Sayyad Aran professional journalist during our nationwide leader. while lecturing in journalism activity I showed this law as an example to all post-Soviet space.

I convocation 
Sayyad Aran represented New Azerbaijan Party at the first convocation elections to Mili Majlis of the Republic of Azerbaijan and he participated in this election with the surname Salahov. He participated at the elections on the basis of majority electoral system and was candidate for deputy from Zardab-Imishly-Ujar electional constituency and he was elected a deputy at the elections held on 12 November 1995. He operated in working group for Azerbaijan-China interparliamentary relations on 7 March 1997.

II convocation 
Sayyad Aran represented the New Azerbaijan Party at the II convocation elections for Milli Majlis of the Republic of Azerbaijan unlike the previous elections he changed the end of his surname and participated at the election with Salahli surname. He participated at the election on the basis of majoritar electoral system and nominated his candidacy for deputy from the Imishly-Ujar electional constituency No.67 and was elected a deputy at the elections held on 5 November 2000. Since 5 December 2000 during the II convocation he had been the head of the Working Group for Azerbaijan-Malaysia Inter-Parliamentary relations and operated in working group for Azerbaijan-China interparliamentary relations.

Diplomatic activity 
On 9 October 2006 he was given the diplomatic rank – first grade Extraordinary and Plenipotentiary envoy of the Republic of Azerbaijan. From 9 October 2006 to 3 May 2010 he was the Council General of the Republic of Azerbaijan in Istanbul, Turkey and From 14 December 2006 to 3 May 2010 he had served as a Permanent Representative to the Organization of the Black Sea Economic Cooperation.

In 2009 he was awarded the nomination of "diplomat of the year" of First Business magazine's "Tops-2008" (Zirvadakilar-2008) award for his services on the deepening of friendship and fraternity relations between Azerbaijan and Turkey during his diplomatic activity.

Activity at the State Committee 

He was appointed the first deputy chairman of the State Committee on Religious Associations on 16 November 2012 by the Order of the President of the Republic of Azerbaijan. Sayyad Aran is the first person that appointed first deputy chairman of the State Committee on Religious Associations of the Republic of Azerbaijan. Until this appointment there had never been the first deputy chairman staff and on the same day as appointment the changes on the statue of the State Committee on Religious Associations were done by the decree of the President of the Republic of Azerbaijan and new staff unit were opened in the structure of the State Committee. Currently local representations (departments for regions) of the State Committee on Religious Associations is under the authority of Sayyad Aran. He was included in the editorial council of the "Society and Religion" newspaper, established by that committee in January 2013 and firstly, the 187th issue of the newspaper dated 10–16 January 2013 was published with its chief editor. In the same issue of the newspaper Sayyad Aran also wrote an essay.

He has been to Hajj pilgrimage on 2–17 September 2016.

Artistic-publicist activity 
He has been member of Azerbaijan Writers' Union since 1991, member of Azerbaijan Journalists' Union since 1998, member of Fizuli lore assembly in the Transcaucasian Muslims Board since 2002, member of the International Association of Russian-speaking Journalists since 2003. In 2004-2015 he was elected  a member of the board of directors of Azerbaijan Writers' Union.

His articles were regularly published with Sayyad Sadiq signature in "Young teacher" newspaper published at the Azerbaijan State Pedagogical Institute in 1968–1972 during his student years. Since 1978, he has made artistic and publicist speeches at the Republican press.

His debut in artistic creativity happened in 1978. His first work was "Ibish uncle" story published in the 11th edition of "Ulduz" magazine, Baku in 1978. Later, his works were published in "Azerbaijan", "Literature Azerbaijan", "Qrakan Azerbaidjan", "Youth", "Azerbaijan Women", "Pioner" magazines, "Literature and art", "Voice", "525th newspaper", "Road", "Dede Gorgud" and other newspapers. "Bridge" is his first book published in "Ganjlik" publishing house, Baku in 1983.

Doctor of Philology, Professor Akif Huseynov presented the "Bridge" story as one of the most successful stories of the year at the annual conference devoted to the results of the Azerbaijan Writers' Union in 1985. The 60-year jubilee event of Sayyad Aran was held at the Natavan club of the Azerbaijan Writers' Union on 14 November 2012. Speaking at the jubilee ceremony, the People's Writer of Azerbaijan, Movlud Suleymanli, made a speech at the jubilee ceremony and assessed his performance as follows: Sayyad Aran is a writer who is close to all that is happening – events that surround us. He does not write anything remotely even if it is smallest details. If he does not pass it through himself and does not create intimacy he does not write it. That's why his works are so alive and healthy.

His literary and social activity was awarded with "Progress" medal, "Gold pen" award and "Inam" honors diploma.

His books 
"Bridge" (stories). Baku: "Youth", 1983. (Azerbaijan)
"Cold solar" (narrative and stories). Baku: "Tabriz", 1996. (Azerbaijan)
"From chaos to stability" (political-publicist book reflecting the events taking place in the country after Heydar Aliyev's second term in 1992–1997). Baku: 1997. (Azerbaijan)
"The Nobel Peace Prize looks on the horizon" (political-publicist articles). Baku: 2003. (Azerbaijan)
"Psychology in the Azerbaijani prose in 1960–80" (monograph on the work of Movlud Suleymanli). Baku: 2004. (Azerbaijan)
"Heydar Aliyev and Azerbaijan's state oil strategy" ("Heydar Aliyev and Azerbaijan's state oil strategy"). Istanbul: 2009. (Turkey)
"White paper" (Azerbaijan. "Clean Paper"). (stories and narratives). Istanbul: "Millennium", 2010. (Turkey)
"Stuck in the box" (stories). Baku: "Law", 2012. (Azerbaijan)
"Frost" (book of narratives). Baku: "Vektor" Publishing House, 2016 (Azerbaijan)
"Thanksgiving for the mornings" (a collection of articles and interviews on national and spiritual values). Baku: "Tuna" publishing house, 2017. (Azerbaijan)
"Headstone" (novel). Baku, "Science and education" publishing house, 2020.
"Pledge" (stories). Belgrade, Serbia: CZQR "Jovan" Publishing House, 2020 (Serb.) 
"Tombstone" (novel). Istanbul: "Zengin yayncılık" publishing house, 2020 (Turkish)
"Wake Up" (stories). Tabriz: "Azer-Turan" publishing house, 2021 (Az.) (Persian)
"Gaybulla's Profit" (stories) Moscow: Ridera publishing house, 2021 (in Russian)
"Roads to Irevan", (novel), Science and education publishing house, 2021
"Return of the Crown", (novel), Science and education publishing house, 2022

Family 
He is married and has three sons and seven grandchildren.

Awards 
1988 – "Best Komsomolchu Teacher" badge.
2001 – "Golden Pen" Award.
2001 – Honorary Citizen of the US state of Texas.
2005 (21 June) – "Progress" medal.
2005 – Honor diploma "Belief" ("Inam") of the Azerbaijani media.
2009 (June) – Laureate of the "Diplomacy of the Year" nomination "Tops-2008" of First Business magazine published in Turkey.
2015 (15 July) – "Honored Journalist".
2017 (19 May) – International Rasul Rza Award.
2019- Jubilee medal of the 100th anniversary of diplomatic services of the Republic of Azerbaijan
2021 - He was elected a full member of the International Academy of Sciences of the Turkic World Studies and was awarded the "International Gold Star" medal for his effective activities in the direction of the development of the culture and science of the Turkic world and the Turkish-Azerbaijani fraternal relations.
2021 — He was awarded the international award named after Shahmar Akbarzade of "Vector" International Academy of Sciences
2022- Order of “Shohrat” for efficient activities in the field of civil service.
2022 — He was awarded the "Mahmud Kashgari" award established by the International Foundation named after Mahmud Kashgari for promoting Turkish culture in the world and promoting it in a wide area.
2022 — Awarded the international "Medal of Honor of the Turkish World" by the Professional Association of Owners of Scientific and Literary Works of Turkey (ILESAM)
2022 – He was awarded with a special diploma of the Azerbaijan Writers' Union

References

External links 

 Azərbaycan Respublikası Dini Qurumlarla İş üzrə Dövlət Komitəsinin saytında Səyyad Adil oğlu Salahlı 
 YouTubedə Səyyad Aranla Pkk karabaga mı yerleşiyor? mövzusunda müsahibə.
 Səyyad Aranın "Günün günorta çağı sevişənlər" hekayəsi. "Zerdab. Com" saytı. 24 May 2012, səh. 5. 
 Səyyad Aranın "Sandıqda qalan muştuluq" hekayəsi. Ədəbiyyat qəzeti. 9 noyabr 2012, səh. 5. 
 Səyyad Aranın "Brak" hekayəsi. "Qafqazinfo. Az" internet qəzeti. 15 yanvar 2013. 
 Səyyad Aranın "Qətl" hekayəsi. "Qafqazinfo. Az" internet qəzeti. 21 yanvar 2013. 
 Səyyad Aranın "Girov qoyulan saqqal" hekayəsi. "Azad Azərbaycan" qəzeti. 14 oktyabr 2012, səh. 7. 
 Azərbaycan Kitabxanaları Toplu elektron Kataloqu. 

Recipients of the Tereggi Medal
1952 births
Azerbaijani diplomats
Azerbaijani writers
Azerbaijani publicists
Baku State University alumni
New Azerbaijan Party politicians
Living people